Maryann Keller was an American automotive industry analyst and author. Keller covered the auto industry as a Wall Street analyst from the 1970s until the 1990s. She was last the principal at Maryann Keller & Associates, an automotive consultancy firm she founded in 2001. She died on June 16, 2022, at the age of 78.

Personal life 
Maryann Keller, née Katula, grew up in Perth Amboy, New Jersey. Her parents were Henry Katula, a factory hand at National Lead Company, and his wife, Helen, a nurse. Keller married Jay Chai a former vice-chairman and CEO of the Japanese trading company Itochu in 1984. Maryann and Jay have three children.

Education 
Keller attended Rutgers University, where she obtained a bachelor's degree in chemistry.

Career 
Keller became an auto analyst in the 1970s and according to the New York Times was "the first woman to be an auto analyst" in the United States. In 1989 she published Rude Awakening; The Rise, Fall and Struggle to Recover at General Motors which predicted the rise of Japanese automakers to the detriment of the Detroit three. The book won the Eccles Prize for Economic Literature from Columbia University.

After leaving her position as a Wall Street analyst in 1999, Keller managed Priceline.com's automotive division and later started her own consultancy company in 2001.

Publications 
 1989 Rude Awakening; The Rise, Fall and Struggle to Recover at General Motors
 1993,  "Collision: GM, Toyota, and Volkswagen and the Race to Own the Twenty-first Century."

References

External links
 

1943 births
Living people
People from Perth Amboy, New Jersey
American business executives
American women in business
Technical analysts
Rutgers University alumni
Baruch College alumni